Balls of Fury is a 2007 American sports comedy film directed by Robert Ben Garant, who also wrote the screenplay with Thomas Lennon, who also co-starred and produced with Roger Birnbaum, Gary Barber and Jonathan Glickman. The film stars Dan Fogler, with a supporting cast of George Lopez, Christopher Walken, Maggie Q, Terry Crews, Cary-Hiroyuki Tagawa, James Hong and Jason Scott Lee. The film was released in the United States on August 29, 2007. Balls of Fury was Fogler's first lead role.

Plot
Eleven-year-old Randy Daytona becomes anxious when he learns that his father Peter has bet on his performance in the 1988 Summer Olympics table tennis tournament finals. During his semi-final game against Karl Wolfschtagg of the German Democratic Republic, Daytona has an accident and suffers an injury. Unable to continue, he loses the match. Loan sharks, in the employ of criminal mastermind Feng, murder his father, and Daytona leaves competitive ping-pong.

Nineteen years later, Daytona is dismissed from the Peppermill casino and meets FBI agent Ernie Rodriguez, who requests his assistance in arresting Feng for gunrunning. Feng's hidden jungle hideout hosts an underground table tennis tournament, and Daytona's invitation is a way for the FBI to infiltrate Feng's organization. When Daytona agrees, Rodriguez tells him to win enough championships that Feng's scouts notice him. After losing a local tournament, Daytona is apprenticed to a blind man in Chinatown named Wong, who was Feng's former mentor. Daytona also meets Wong's niece, Maggie. When locals vandalize Master Wong's house for violating their edict against teaching white people ping-pong, Daytona is forced to play against "The Dragon", a young girl, in exchange for Wong's right to stay. After Daytona beats the Dragon and gets punched, Feng's men take notice of his win and bring Daytona, Rodriguez, and Wong to Feng's facility.

Daytona handily beats his first opponent, Freddy "Fingers" Wilson, though he is unnerved to learn that the tournament is literally sudden death—the loser is killed by a poisoned dart delivered by Feng's majordomo, Mahogany. After Daytona unsuccessfully attempts to escape, Feng invites him to join his side and reveals that he only finished half of Wong's training. He says it would be the ultimate satisfaction to win Daytona away from Wong. Feng also shows Daytona his specially modified ping-pong table. It is wired to special vests that give increasingly powerful and fatal electrical shocks for failure. Daytona informs Rodriguez of a hidden cache of illegal guns that are sufficient to put Feng in jail. While Rodriguez investigates the hidden facilities, Daytona defeats numerous opponents for his life.

Upon learning that Wolfschtagg is his last opponent, Daytona requests extraction. Rodriguez comes up with a plan to brutally injure Daytona so that he can safely concede. Rodriguez breaks Daytona's arm before Daytona can tell him that he has changed his mind. Feng discovers Rodriguez's attempts to contact the FBI and forces Daytona to face Wolfschtagg, then substitutes Maggie. When Wolfschtagg protests, Feng kills him. Daytona plays one-handed and tries to stall for time. Maggie tries to lose on purpose to sacrifice herself. However, Daytona uses his ping-pong expertise to hit Maggie with the ball. While this goes on, they escape together. Enraged, Feng orders them both executed. Mahogany shoots a poisonous dart at Daytona, but Maggie thwarts her. Daytona throws the poisoned paddle back at Mahogany, killing her. The FBI swarms the place, during which the heroes attempt to escape, but Daytona's attempts to rescue Feng's slaves cause their capture. Feng plays Daytona to determine which of Wong's students is the superior ping pong player.

During the game, Daytona trips Feng's bodyguard and sets off the self-destruct sequence. Feng reveals there is no way to turn off the suits. He also states that he changed the rules so that the ball can now be bounced off any surface once and still be in play. The game moves through several buildings and finally onto a bridge over a nearby river. After Wong informs Daytona that Feng has a weak backhand, Daytona exploits his weakness, and Feng is electrocuted, falling into the river. Daytona and his friends, along with Feng's slaves, escape in Wong's boat as the facility explodes. Two months later, the major characters are reunited for the reopening of Wong's rebuilt Mushu shop while also still hosting ping-pong games. Wong inadvertently falls down the elevator shaft, to Randy, Rodriguez, and Maggie's shock.

Cast

 Dan Fogler as Randy Daytona
 Christopher Walken as Feng
 George Lopez as Agent Ernie Rodriguez
 Maggie Q as Maggie Wong
 James Hong as Master Wong
 Robert Patrick as Sgt. Pete Daytona
 Aisha Tyler as Mahogany
 Thomas Lennon as Karl Wolfschtagg
 Diedrich Bader as Gary
 Cary-Hiroyuki Tagawa as Mysterious Asian Man
 Jason Scott Lee as Eddie
 Terry Crews as Freddy "Fingers" Wilson
 Patton Oswalt as "The Hammer"
 David Koechner as Rick the Birdmaster

Reception
, the film holds a 21% approval rating on Rotten Tomatoes, based on 131 reviews with an average score of 4.2/10. The site's consensus reads: "Tasteless, yet harmless, Balls of Fury nevertheless fails to generate enough laughs despite its lowbrow intentions".  
On Metacritic the film has a score of 38 out of 100 based on 26 reviews, indicating "generally unfavorable reviews."

Brian Lowry of Variety magazine wrote: "Relentlessly silly in spoofing martial-arts movie conventions, Balls of Fury has roughly enough laughs for a first-class trailer but wheezes, gasps and finally goes flat through much of its 90 minutes." Film historian Leonard Maltin was even less kind, declaring the picture a BOMB (his lowest possible rating), while describing it as a "...One-joke comedy that's every bit as inane and stupid as its premise. James Hong steals every scene he's in; but, alas, it's petty theft." Roger Ebert was more favorable in his review for the Chicago Sun-Times, giving it two-and-a-half out of four stars and recommending it as a modest comedy of "sheer absurdity".

The film opened  with a U.S. take on the opening weekend of $11,352,123. The U.S. final gross, on November 4, 2007, was $32,886,940.

Video game
A tie-in game for Balls of Fury was released for Wii and Nintendo DS by Black Lantern. The storyline involves an underground ping-pong competition, based on the film. The Nintendo DS version was released on September 9, 2007, with the Wii version following on September 25.  Both versions take advantage of motion controls to play ping pong, and were not well received.  The Wii version was panned by critics, while the Nintendo DS version received better, but mixed reviews.  IGN scored the Wii version a 1.2 out of 10, but scored the DS version a 6.5 out of 10.

References

External links
 
 
 
 
 

2007 films
2007 comedy films
2000s sports comedy films
American films about revenge
American sports comedy films
2000s English-language films
Films about the 1988 Summer Olympics
Films directed by Robert Ben Garant
Films produced by Roger Birnbaum
Films scored by Randy Edelman
Films set in Los Angeles
Films shot in California
Focus Features films
Intrepid Pictures films
Nintendo DS games
Rogue (company) films
Spyglass Entertainment films
Table tennis films
Triad films
Wii games
2000s American films
2000s Hong Kong films